In nuclear ethics and deterrence theory, No first use (NFU) refers to a type of pledge or policy wherein a nuclear power formally refrains from the use of nuclear weapons or other weapons of mass destruction (WMDs) in warfare, except for as a second strike in retaliation to an attack by an enemy power using WMDs. Such a pledge would allow for a unique state of affairs in which a given nuclear power can be engaged in a conflict of conventional weaponry while it purposefully foregoes any of the strategic advantages of nuclear weapons, provided the enemy power does not possess or utilize any such weapons of their own. The concept is primarily invoked in reference to nuclear mutually assured destruction but has also been applied to chemical and biological warfare, as is the case of the official WMD policy of India.

China and India are currently the only two nuclear powers to formally maintain a No First Use policy, adopting pledges in 1964 and 1998 respectively. Both NATO and a number of its member states have repeatedly rejected calls for adopting a NFU policy, as during the lifetime of the Soviet Union a pre-emptive nuclear strike was commonly argued as a key option to afford NATO a credible nuclear deterrent, compensating for the overwhelming conventional weapon superiority enjoyed by the Soviet Army in Eurasia. In 1993, Russia dropped a pledge against first use of nuclear weapons made in 1982 by Leonid Brezhnev, with Russian military doctrine later stating in 2000 that Russia reserves the right to use nuclear weapons "in response to a large-scale conventional aggression". Pakistan has also made similar statements, largely in reference to intermittent military tensions with India. North Korea has publicly pledged to refrain from a preemptive nuclear strike, while threatening retaliation up to and including WMDs against conventional aggression.

Countries pledging no-first-use

China

China became the first nuclear-weapon state to make public its NFU pledge, when it first gained nuclear capabilities in 1964, and the only state as of 2018 "to maintain an unconditional NFU pledge." In other words, it has undertaken "not to be the first to use nuclear weapons at any time or under any circumstances" and "not to use or threaten to use nuclear weapons against any non-nuclear-weapons states or nuclear-weapon-free zones at any time or under any circumstances." During the Cold War, China decided to keep the size of its nuclear arsenal small, rather than compete in an international nuclear arms race with the United States and the Soviet Union. China has repeatedly reaffirmed its no-first-use policy in recent years, doing so in 2005, 2008, 2009 and again in 2011. China has also consistently called on the United States to adopt a no-first-use policy, to reach an NFU agreement bilaterally with China, and to conclude an NFU agreement among the five nuclear weapon states.

India

India first adopted a "no first use" policy after its second nuclear tests, Pokhran-II, in 1998. In August 1999, the Indian government released a draft of the doctrine which asserts that nuclear weapons are solely for deterrence and that India will pursue a policy of "retaliation only". The document also maintains that India "will not be the first to initiate a nuclear first strike, but will respond with punitive retaliation should deterrence fail" and that decisions to authorise the use of nuclear weapons would be made by the prime minister or his "designated successor(s)". According to the National Research Development Corporation, despite the escalation of tensions between India and Pakistan in 2001–2002, India remained committed to its nuclear no-first-use policy. India is in the process of developing a nuclear doctrine based on "credible minimum deterrence".

In a speech at the National Defence College by India's National Security Advisor, Shivshankar Menon, on October 21, 2010, the wording was changed from "no first use" to "no first use against non-nuclear weapon states", but some argued that it was not a substantive change but "an innocent typographical or lexical error in the text of the speech". Prime Minister Modi has, before the recent general elections, reiterated commitment to a no-first-use policy. In April 2013, Shyam Saran, convener of the National Security Advisory Board, affirmed that regardless of the size of a nuclear attack against India, be it a tactical nuclear weapon or a strategic nuclear weapon, India would retaliate massively. That was in response to reports that Pakistan had developed a tactical battlefield nuclear weapon in an attempt to supposedly nullify an Indian "no first use" retaliatory doctrine. On November 10, 2016, the Indian Defence Minister Manohar Parrikar questioned the no-first-use policy of India, and asked why should India "bind" itself when it is a "responsible nuclear power". He clarified that it was his personal opinion.

Indian Defence Minister Rajnath Singh, speaking on the anniversary of the death of former Prime Minister Atal Bihari Vajpayee on August 16, 2019, said that India's no-first-use policy might change depending upon the "circumstances". Vajpayee's government conducted the Pokhran-II nuclear tests in 1998.

Countries against no-first-use policy

Pakistan, Russia, the United Kingdom, the United States, and France say that they will use nuclear weapons against either nuclear or non-nuclear states only in the case of invasion or other attack against their territory or against one of their allies. Historically, NATO military strategy, taking into account the numerical superiority of Warsaw Pact conventional forces, assumed that tactical nuclear weapons would have to be used to defeat a Soviet invasion.

At the 16th NATO summit in April 1999, Germany proposed that NATO adopt a no-first-use policy, but the proposal was rejected. In 2022, leaders of the five NPT nuclear-weapon states issued a statement on prevention of nuclear war, saying "We affirm that a nuclear war cannot be won and must never be fought."

Soviet Union/Russia 
In its final years, the Soviet Union adopted a formal no-first-use in 1982 when Foreign Minister Andrei Gromyko read out at the United Nations a pledge by General Secretary Leonid Brezhnev not to launch a pre-emptive nuclear strike. However, this pledge was not taken seriously, and later leaked Soviet Armed Forces documents confirmed that the military had plans for a pre-emptive nuclear strike and considered launching one during the Able Archer 83 crisis. After the dissolution of the Soviet Union, the Russian Federation formally reversed this policy in 1993 due to the weakness of the Russian Armed Forces in the post-Soviet era. Russia describes its entire military doctrine as defensive military doctrine.
With regard to nuclear weapons specifically, Russia reserves the right to use nuclear weapons:
 in response to the use of nuclear and other types of weapons of mass destruction against it or its allies, and also
 in case of aggression against Russia with the use of conventional weapons when the very existence of the state is threatened.
The new military doctrine of 2014 does not depart from this stance.
The 2020 Presidential Executive Order on Nuclear Deterrence in Article 4 uses the wording: "deterrence of a potential adversary from aggression against the Russian Federation and/or its allies. In the event of a military conflict, this Policy provides for the prevention of an escalation of military actions and their termination on conditions that are acceptable for the Russian Federation and/or its allies." This has been interpreted as describing non-nuclear scenarios where Russia might use nuclear weapons to achieve its military goals. During the 2022 Russian invasion of Ukraine, observers expressed concern that Russia would preemptively use tactical nuclear weapons after President Vladimir Putin announced the mobilization of Russian nuclear forces to "combat-ready" status. However, in December 2022, Putin claimed that Russia would never use nuclear weapons first.

Russia and China do maintain a mutual agreement to have a no first use policy which was developed under the Treaty of Good-Neighborliness and Friendly Cooperation. Under the second paragraph of article two, China and Russia agreed that "The contracting parties reaffirm their commitment that they will not be the first to use nuclear weapons against each other nor target strategic nuclear missiles against each other."

On December 7, 2022, president Putin stated that Russia will not be the first to use nuclear weapons in a conflict, neither will "it be the second" to do so.

United Kingdom
In March 2002, the Secretary of State for Defence Geoff Hoon stated that the UK was prepared to use nuclear weapons against "rogue states" such as Ba'athist Iraq if they ever used "weapons of mass destruction" against British Armed Forces troops in the field. This policy was restated in February 2003 and again under the Ministry of Defence's Strategic Defence and Security Review 2010. In April 2017 Defence Secretary Michael Fallon confirmed that the UK would use nuclear weapons in a "pre-emptive initial strike" in "the most extreme circumstances". Fallon stated in a parliamentary answer that the UK has neither a 'first use' or 'no first use' in its nuclear weapon policy so that its adversaries would not know when the UK would launch nuclear strikes.

United States
The United States has refused to adopt a no first use policy and says that it "reserves the right to use" nuclear weapons first in the case of conflict. This was partially  to provide a nuclear umbrella over its allies in NATO as a deterrent against a conventional Warsaw Pact attack during the Cold War, and NATO continues to oppose a no-first-use policy. Not only did the United States and NATO refuse to adopt a no first use policy, but until 1967 they maintained a nuclear doctrine of "massive retaliation" in which nuclear weapons would explicitly be used to defend North America or Western Europe against a conventional attack. Although this strategy was revised, they both reserved the right to use nuclear weapons first under the new doctrine of "flexible response."

The US doctrine for the use of nuclear weapons was revised most recently in the Nuclear Posture Review, released April 6, 2010.  The 2010 Nuclear Posture Review reduces the role of U.S. nuclear weapons: "The fundamental role of U.S. nuclear weapons, which will continue as long as nuclear weapons exist, is to deter nuclear attack on the United States, our allies, and partners." The U.S. doctrine also includes the following assurance to other states: "The United States will not use or threaten to use nuclear weapons against non-nuclear weapons states that are party to the NPT and in compliance with their nuclear non-proliferation obligations."

For states eligible for the assurance, the United States would not use nuclear weapons in response to a chemical or biological attack but states that those responsible for such an attack would be held accountable and would face the prospect of a devastating conventional military response. Even for states that are not eligible for the assurance, the United States would consider the use of nuclear weapons only in extreme circumstances to defend the vital interests of the United States or its allies and partners. The Nuclear Posture Review also notes, "It is in the U.S. interest and that of all other nations that the nearly 65-year record of nuclear non-use be extended forever."

This supersedes the doctrine of the George W. Bush administration set forth in "Doctrine for Joint Nuclear Operations" and written under the direction of Air Force General Richard Myers, chairman of the Joint Chiefs of Staff. The new doctrine envisions commanders requesting presidential approval to use nuclear weapons to preempt an attack by a nation or a terrorist group using weapons of mass destruction. The draft also includes the option of using nuclear weapons to destroy known enemy stockpiles of nuclear, biological, or chemical weapons.

In August 2016, President Barack Obama reportedly considered adopting a 'No First Use' policy. Obama was persuaded by several Cabinet officials such as Secretary of State John Kerry, Secretary of Defense Ash Carter, and Secretary of Energy Ernest Moniz that 'No First Use' would rattle U.S. allies and decided not to take up the policy.

During the 2017–2018 North Korea crisis, there were efforts to either require congressional approval for a pre-emptive nuclear strike or to ban it altogether and impose an NFU policy. The Senate Foreign Relations Committee chaired by Bob Corker held its first meeting on the President's authority to use nuclear weapons in 41 years. Since 2017, Ted Lieu, Ed Markey, Elizabeth Warren, and Adam Smith all introduced bills to limit the President's ability to order a pre-emptive nuclear strike. Calls to limit the President of the United States' ability to unilaterally launch a pre-emptive nuclear strike increased after the January 6 United States Capitol attack. During the 2020 United States presidential election the eventual victor Joe Biden expressed support for a "sole purpose" declaration confirming that the only use of U.S. nuclear weapons would be as a deterrent, although this is distinct from a "no first use" declaration identifying that the United States would not unilaterally use them.

Pakistan

Pakistan's Foreign Minister Shamshad Ahmad warned that if Pakistan is ever invaded or attacked, it will use "any weapon in its arsenal" to defend itself.

Pakistan refuses to adopt a no first use doctrine and indicates that it would launch nuclear weapons even if the other side did not use such weapons first. Pakistan's asymmetric nuclear posture has significant influence on India's ability to retaliate, as shown in 2001 and 2008 crises, when non-state actors carried out deadly terrorist attacks on India, only to be met with a relatively subdued response from India. A military spokesperson stated that "Pakistan's threat of nuclear first-use deterred India from seriously considering conventional military strikes."

Pakistan's National Security Advisor Sartaj Aziz defended the policy of first use. Aziz stated that Pakistan's first use doctrine is entirely deterrent in nature. He explained that it was effective after the 2001 Indian Parliament attack and argued that if Pakistan had a no first use policy, there would have been a major war between the two countries.

North Korea

North Korea's stated policy position is that nuclear weapons "will never be abused or used as a means for preemptive strike", but if there is an "attempt to have recourse to military force against us" North Korea may use their "most powerful offensive strength in advance to punish them".

Israel
Although Israel does not officially confirm or deny having nuclear weapons, the country is widely believed to be in possession of them. Its continued ambiguous stance puts it in a difficult position since to issue a statement pledging 'no first use' would confirm their possession of nuclear weapons.

Israel has said that it "would not be the first country in the Middle East to formally introduce nuclear weapons into the region".

If Israel's very existence is threatened, some speculate that Israel would use a "Samson Option", a "last resort" deterrence strategy of massive retaliation with nuclear weapons, should the State of Israel be substantially damaged and/or near destruction. According to Israeli historian Avner Cohen, Israel's policy on nuclear weapons, which was set down in 1966, revolves around four "red lines" which could lead to an Israeli nuclear response:

 A successful military penetration into populated areas within Israel's borders.
 The destruction of the Israeli Air Force.
 Israeli cities being subjected to massive and devastating aerial bombardment, chemical attacks, or biological attacks.
 The use of nuclear weapons against Israel.

See also

 Nuclear disarmament

References

Further reading
 Feiveson, Harold A.; Hogendoorn, Ernst Jan: "No First Use of Nuclear Weapons", in: The Nonproliferation Review. 10(2)/2003. The Center for Nonproliferation Studies, 
 MacDonald, Rhona: "Nuclear Weapons 60 Years On: Still a Global Public Health Threat", in: PLoS Medicine. 2(11)/2005. Public Library of Science, e301,

External links
 Document of nuclear doctrine of India
 Andrew Yeh, "China Acts to Ease Fears over N-arms Policy", Financial Times, July 25, 2005 
 Publication of US guidelines in nuclear operations

Foreign policy doctrines of India
International law
Military doctrines
Nuclear strategy
Chinese foreign policy